Roberto Mandressi (born November 19, 1960)  is an Italian former professional footballer who played as a forward. He made 258 appearances in the Italian professional leagues, and played for 3 seasons (21 games, 1 goal) in Serie A for AC Milan and Como.

See also
Football in Italy
List of football clubs in Italy

References

1960 births
Living people
People from Seregno
Italian footballers
Association football forwards
U.S. 1913 Seregno Calcio players
A.C. Milan players
Como 1907 players
Delfino Pescara 1936 players
Piacenza Calcio 1919 players
Carrarese Calcio players
Cavese 1919 players
Catania S.S.D. players
S.S. Monopoli 1966 players
Serie C players
Serie A players
Serie B players
Footballers from Lombardy
Sportspeople from the Province of Monza e Brianza